Ismail Khaldi (born 1971) is the first Bedouin diplomat in the Israeli Ministry of Foreign Affairs.

Early life
Ismail Khaldi was born in Khawaled, Israel a village near Haifa. He is the third of eleven children. He lived in a Bedouin tent until the age of eight. He walked four miles (6 km) round trip to attend school and tended flocks of sheep. He said his family's ties with its Jewish neighbors go back to the days of the early Zionist pioneers from Eastern Europe who settled in the Galilee region in the 1920s.

Khaldi earned a bachelor's degree in political science from the University of Haifa and a master's degree in political science and international relations from Tel Aviv University. He served in the Israeli Ministry of Defense, Israel Police, and in the Israel Defense Forces as a political analyst.

Khaldi initiated a project called "Hike and Learn with Bedouins in the Galilee" that has brought thousands of young Jews to Khawaled to learn about Bedouin culture and history. He said these encounters inspired him to become a diplomat.

Diplomatic career
Khaldi began working for the Israeli Foreign Ministry in 2004. In June 2006, he was appointed to serve in San Francisco, California, United States. In August 2009, Khaldi was appointed policy advisor to the Minister of Foreign Affairs Avigdor Lieberman. He describes Lieberman as "one of the most realistic, of course, but honest and direct politicians in Israel."

On Sunday 5th Jul 2020, an internal committee appointed Ishmael Khaldi as Israel's first Bedouin Ambassador, to take up the post in Eritrea.

June 2020 attack 
In June, 2020, Khaldi  filed a police complaint in Israel, after he was beaten by security guards at Jerusalem’s central bus station. Khaldi  believed that the attack was a case of ethnic profiling, and he wanted  to bring attention to "racist behavior in parts of Israeli society".

Disruptions 
In 2011, Khaldi was due to give a talk at the invitation of the University of Edinburgh's Jewish Society.  Pro-Palestinian protesters disrupted the venue, preventing the talk. This was viewed by many as a blow to freedom of speech on campuses.  University security officers had to be brought in after 50 protesters claimed to have shut down a lecture.

He was also disrupted by activists at Rutgers University and by Julio Pino, a professor of history at Kent State.

Political views
Khaldi said there is still a long way to go before the Bedouin minority achieves full equality in Israel but the situation is improving, and more Bedouins are graduating from high school, entering universities and getting better jobs than ever before. "There are differences in tradition and religion between us, but at the end of the day we are all Israeli citizens". He considers himself a proud Bedouin and regards a Jewish state as beneficial to his community. He says it is through the alliance with Israel that the Bedouins have begun to transcend the isolation created by their nomadic traditions.

Bibliography
 2010: A Shepherd's Journey: the story of Israel's first Bedouin diplomat.

See also

References

External links
 Official website

Bedouin Israelis
Israeli Muslims
Israeli diplomats
Israeli civil servants
Living people
University of Haifa alumni
1971 births
Arab citizens of Israel
Muslim supporters of Israel
Ambassadors of Israel to Eritrea
Israeli consuls